John Crowell may refer to:

John Crowell (Alabama politician) (1780–1846), Delegate and Representative from Alabama
John Crowell (Ohio politician) (1801–1883), Representative from Ohio
John Franklin Crowell (1857–1931), President of Trinity College (later Duke University)